William "Wild Guy" Grasso was an Italian-American mobster from East Haven, Connecticut who rose to the position of underboss in the Patriarca crime family, also known as the New England crime family, the Providence crime family or the Boston crime family. The Patriarca family is a Mafia crime family based in New England. Succeeding his father Raymond L.S. Patriarca as boss after his father's death in 1984, Raymond junior was considered a weak leader. He managed to keep the peace in his crime family due to the support of the Gambino crime family of New York. In 1987 when Junior's original underboss Ilario "Larry Baione" Maria Antonio Zannino was sentenced to thirty years in prison thus weakening Junior's position, with Zannino incarcerated, Grasso became underboss. 

Law enforcement officials believed that Grasso who was known for his ruthlessness  was actually in charge, but these rumors ended when Grasso was killed on June 13, 1989.

With the death of Grasso, Raymond Patriarca, Jr.'s position as boss was further weakened and in 1990, was superseded by Nicholas Bianco, the acting underboss after Grasso's death.  In 1991, Bianco was one of the defendants tried for the murder of Grasso.

Restaurateur Gaetano Milano of East Longmeadow, Massachusetts, a suburb of Springfield, was charged with the murder of Grasso. "Wild Guy" reportedly was murdered as the two were traveling on Interstate 91 to what Grasso believed was a meeting with Carlo Mastrototaro, a Worcester gangster, to settle a dispute about vending machine territories in Springfield. Springfield was a fiefdom of the Genovese crime family, operating with Patriarca family approval.

Milano and his confederates Frank Colantoni Jr. and brothers Frank Pugliano and Louis Pugliano were convicted of conspiracy to commit racketeering. Milano was also convicted of murder. During his trial, it was found out he had recently been made a member of the  Mafia. 

He admitted to the murder, claiming it was part of a power struggle between the various factions of the Patriarca family and that it was a case of "kill or be killed" – that if he didn't kill Grasso, "Wild Guy" would have killed him. He was sentenced to 33 years, which was reduced by seven years after a appeals during which his attorney argued that Federal Bureau of Investigation informants, including FBI "Top Echelon" informant Angelo Mercurio, and corrupt investigators had stirred up trouble among New England gangsters, including Milano and Grasso. In 2012,  Milano entered a pre-release program as he had been rehabilitated.

Louis Pugliano, who had received a life sentence was released in 2006 after serving 15 years. His lawyers secured a resentencing agreement with prosecutors who admitted that Pugliano received ineffective counsel and was hurt by a flawed jury selection process.

References

 

1989 deaths
American crime bosses
American gangsters of Italian descent
Patriarca crime family
Year of birth missing
People from East Haven, Connecticut
People murdered in Massachusetts